Mesanerpeton is an extinct genus of four-limbed stem-tetrapod from the Mississippian (Tournaisian) of Scotland. It contains a single species, Mesanerpeton woodi, who  based on a disarticulated specimen including a clavicle, vertebrae, and forelimb bones from the Ballagan Formation. The vertebrae are poorly-ossified and similar to Crassigyrinus, but the forelimb was robust. The shape and level of torsion present in the humerus are intermediate between Devonian stem-tetrapods and later Carboniferous tetrapods. This transitional condition, and the associated rerouting of the brachial artery and median nerve, may indicate that Mesanerpeton had a higher stride length and more efficient locomotion on land compared to its predecessors.

References and Notes

Notes

Carboniferous tetrapods of Europe
Stegocephalians
Mississippian animals
Prehistoric tetrapod genera
Fossil taxa described in 2016
Taxa named by Jenny Clack